Jacques Rambaud (25 April 1906 – 14 September 2006) was a French sailor. He competed in the mixed 6 metres at the 1936 Summer Olympics.

References

External links
 
 

1906 births
2006 deaths
French centenarians
Olympic sailors of France
Sailors at the 1936 Summer Olympics – 6 Metre
French male sailors (sport)
Men centenarians
Sportspeople from Évreux